Softly with These Songs: The Best of Roberta Flack is Roberta Flack's third compilation album and was released in 1993.

Track listing

All track information and credits were taken from the CD liner notes.

Certifications

References

Roberta Flack albums
1993 greatest hits albums
Atlantic Records compilation albums